The Great Blasket is the principal island of the Blaskets, County Kerry, Ireland. It was home to a small fishing community of Irish speakers until the island was abandoned in 1954 when living there became unsustainable.

Geography

The nearest mainland town is Dunquin; a ferry to the island operates from a nearby pier during summer months.

Garraun Point at  has been incorrectly cited as being the most westerly point of the Irish mainland, but this is Dunmore Head. At longitude 10° 39.7', Tearaght Island is the westernmost of the Blaskets, and thus the most westerly point of the republic of Ireland.

History
The Great Blasket has been inhabited on and off for centuries. The earliest known reference to people living on the island was at the start of the 1700s. A Ferriter castle once stood at Rinn an Chaisleáin. In the 1840s it was estimated that a population of about 150 people were living on the island. It was the most westerly settlement in Ireland, with islanders mostly living in primitive cottages perched on the relatively sheltered north-east shore. They subsisted mainly on fish, supplementing their diet with potato, oats, hunting rabbits and the eggs of birds who nested on the island; due to lack of wood they had to use heather, peat and turf as fuel. 

Island life was very tough and the draw of emigration was strong, ultimately becoming the death knell for the Island. During WWII shortages of sugar, soap, tea, paraffin, tobacco and flour/bread intensified this draw further.The weather was a present and constant hazard. In April 1947, the island was cut off from the mainland for weeks due to bad weather. The Islanders sent a telegram to the Taoiseach, Éamon de Valera, urgently requesting supplies which duly arrived two days later by boat.

The island was inhabited until 1954 when the Irish government decided that it could no longer guarantee the safety of the remaining but rapidly declining population. In truth, the Islanders had been petitioning for relocation following the death of Seánín Ó Cearnaigh. Seán had become ill and as a result of poor weather, no doctor or priest could reach the island. Continued inclement weather prevented his body being taken to the consecrated graveyard across the Blasket Sound in Dunquin for a number of days. It was this tragic event that led the Islanders to realize there was no continued prospect of a viable community remaining on the island.

In 2009 the Office of Public Works bought most of the property on the island, including the deserted village, and the state is now the majority landowner. Guided tours of the island were launched in 2010 and plans are underway for the preservation and conservation of the old village. The home of Muiris Ó Súilleabháin is now in ruins but Peig Sayers' second home on the island has been restored. The home of Tomás Ó Criomhthain was also restored by the OPW in 2018 and is now free to visit by the public.

In 2014 a company, The Great Blasket Island Experience, began renovation of the Congested Districts Board properties on the island as rental accommodation during the summer season. The company recruits two caretakers annually to manage the accommodation and café facilities where they live without electricity, hot water and other modern conveniences, similar to conditions the islanders endured. This old world living experience has attracted significant media attention about the role with tens of thousands of applications for the position in recent years.

Demographics 
The table below reports data on Great Blasket's population taken from Discover the Islands of Ireland (Alex Ritsema, Collins Press, 1999) and the Census of Ireland.

Literature

Considering the tiny population, the island has produced a remarkable number of gifted writers who brought vividly to life their harsh existence and who kept alive old Irish folk tales of the land. Best known are Machnamh Seanamhná (An Old Woman's Reflections, Peig Sayers, 1939), Fiche Bliain Ag Fás (Twenty Years A-Growing, Muiris Ó Súilleabháin, 1933), and An tOileánach (The Islandman, Tomás Ó Criomhthain, 1929). These are considered to be invaluable records of their harsh existence on the island and a treasure trove of old Irish folk tales of the land.

Ownership dispute
The hostel and café on the island were at the center of a dispute between the Irish State, which wishes to make the island a national park, and an individual, who claims to own the greater part of the island. The differences between the State and Blascaoid Mor Teoranta (BMT) were settled by an agreement made in August 2007; subject to the granting of planning permission, the deal meant that more than 95% of the island land, including the old village, would be sold to the State and become a de facto national park.

References

External links
The Blasket Islands: History and Heritage

Blasket Islands
Uninhabited islands of Ireland
Ghost towns in Europe
Former populated places in Ireland